Sevak: The Confessions is a Pakistani action thriller web series directed by Anjum Shahzad and is originally streaming on Vidly. The series released weekly on the platform with first episode was released on 26 November 2022. It stars an ensemble cast of Hajra Yamin, Mohsin Abbas Haider, Adnan Jaffar, Nayyar Ejaz, Nazarul Hassan and Ammara Malik. Set in India, the series is based on alleged "real events" from 1984 to 2022 about supposed human rights violations in the region.

Cast 

 Hajra Yamin
 Mohsin Abbas Haider
 Adnan Jaffar
 Nayyar Ejaz
 Nazarul Hassan
 Ammara Malik

Production

Release
The first teaser of the series was released in early November 2022 and the first episode was released on 26 November 2022 on Vidly. The series has eight episodes.

Aimed at India's sovereignty, defence and relations with other states, as stated by India's MIB on 12 December 2022, due to which it was banned there along with the platform Vidly.

See also
 Historical negationism
 Pakistani textbooks controversy

References 

Pakistani web series
Anti-Indian sentiment